Piz Forbesch is a mountain of the Oberhalbstein Alps, located near Mulegns in the Swiss canton of Graubünden. It lies approximately 3 kilometres north of Piz Platta.

References

External links

 Piz Forbesch on Hikr

Mountains of Switzerland
Mountains of Graubünden
Mountains of the Alps
Alpine three-thousanders
Surses